Betinho may refer to:
 Betinho (basketball) (born 1985), real name João Gomes, Portuguese basketball player
 Betinho (footballer, born 1966), full name Gilberto Carlos Nascimento, Brazilian football player and manager
 Betinho (footballer, born May 1987), full name Carlos Alberto Santos da Silva, Brazilian footballer
 Betinho (footballer, born December 1987), full name João Roberto Custódio, Brazilian footballer
 Betinho (footballer, born 1992), full name Roberto Pimenta Vinagre Filho, Brazilian football defensive midfielder
 Betinho (footballer, born 1993), full name Alberto Alves Coelho, Portuguese footballer
 Betinho (footballer, born 1994), full name Felisberto Micael Lopes Darame, Portuguese footballer
 Herbert de Souza (1935–1997), Brazilian sociologist and social activist